Alfred Anthony LaMacchia (July 22, 1921 – September 15, 2010) was a professional baseball player and scout.  He was a right-handed pitcher who spent 14 years in the minor leagues where he accumulated a record of 159–117 and spent parts of three seasons (1943, 1945–46) with the St. Louis Browns and Washington Senators compiling a 2–2 record. After his playing career ended, LaMacchia spent six decades as a scout with the Philadelphia Phillies, Atlanta Braves, Toronto Blue Jays, Tampa Bay Rays, and Los Angeles Dodgers, during which time he discovered dozens of players who made it to the major leagues.

Playing career
He was born in St. Louis, Missouri and served with the United States Army during World War II. LaMacchia started his pitching career in the St. Louis Browns organization with the Class D Paragould Browns in 1940, where he had a 16–7 record and worked his way up to the majors with a 15–5 record with the Class C St. Joseph Autos in 1941 and a 15–16 record with the Class A1 San Antonio Missions in 1942. LaMacchia made his major league debut on September 27, 1943, with the Browns, pitching portions of three seasons (1943, 1945–46) as a relief pitcher with the Browns and Washington Senators, with a 2–2 career record, 6.46 earned run average and seven strikeouts in  innings pitched. He returned to the minor leagues, playing for various teams and organizations until 1954.

Scouting
After completing his playing career, LaMacchia became a scout with the Phillies, Braves, Blue Jays, Devil Rays and Dodgers. LaMacchia eschewed the use of computers, radar guns and stop watches as scouting tools, saying "I trust my eyes... Been good so far". He is credited with having scouted players including George Bell, Cito Gaston, Dale Murphy, Dave Stieb, Rocco Baldelli, and David Wells. He convinced Dodgers General Manager Ned Colletti to pursue outfielder Andre Ethier, who had been playing in the Oakland A's organization. While with the Blue Jays he was a vice president when the team won back-to-back championships in the 1992 World Series and 1993 World Series.

Pat Gillick, who as a scout for the New York Yankees competed against him for players in South Texas, mentioned LaMacchia during his induction speech at the National Baseball Hall of Fame on July 24, 2011. Gillick hired LaMacchia to work for the Toronto Blue Jays in 1976.

He was signed by St. Louis Browns scout Lou Maguolo.

LaMacchia died at age 89 on September 15, 2010, at his home in San Antonio, Texas, after having experienced a stroke in the weeks before his death. He was survived by his wife, Ann, as well as by a daughter, a son and grandchildren and great-grandchildren.

References

External links

1921 births
2010 deaths
Atlanta Braves scouts
Austin Pioneers players
Baseball players from St. Louis
Baseball players from San Antonio
Beaumont Exporters players
Birmingham Barons players
Bryan/Del Rio Indians players
Chattanooga Lookouts players
Dallas Eagles players
Fostoria Red Birds players
Fremont Green Sox players
Knoxville Smokies players
Little Rock Travelers players
Los Angeles Dodgers scouts
Major League Baseball pitchers
Milwaukee Braves scouts
Minneapolis Millers (baseball) players
Montgomery Rebels players
Paragould Browns players
Philadelphia Phillies scouts
St. Joseph Autos players
St. Louis Browns players
San Antonio Missions players
Tampa Bay Devil Rays scouts
Toledo Mud Hens players
Toronto Blue Jays scouts
Vicksburg Hill Billies players
Washington Senators (1901–1960) players
Wichita Falls Spudders players
United States Army personnel of World War II